The 1991 Oregon State Beavers football team represented Oregon State University in the 1991 NCAA Division I-A football season. The Beavers had one win and ten losses for their twentieth consecutive losing season. They scored 125 and allowed 365 points. The team was led by first-year head coach Jerry Pettibone, previously the head coach for six seasons at Northern Illinois.

The sole victory came in the season finale, a road upset over rival Oregon in the Civil War.

Schedule

Personnel

Season summary

Oregon

Oregon State carried its seniors off the field, a motivational ploy practiced by head coach Jerry Pettibone during the week.

References

Oregon State
Oregon State Beavers football seasons
Oregon State Beavers football